Kakhaber Sidamonidze (born 17 April 1971) is a retired Georgian professional football player.

1971 births
Living people
Soviet footballers
Footballers from Georgia (country)
Georgia (country) international footballers
FC Guria Lanchkhuti players
FC Dinamo Batumi players
Association football defenders